KEMX (94.5 FM) is a radio station licensed to Locust Grove, Oklahoma, United States, broadcasting an active rock music format. The station is currently owned by Jose Esteban Torres and Jose Moguel, through licensee Key Plus Broadcasting, LLC.

History
On June 20, 2013, Stephens Media Group (KXOJ) sold KEMX to Roger Chasteen's ABS Communications, Inc. out of Tulsa, OK. ABS Communications, Inc. also purchased KTFR and KCXR from Stephens Media Group in the same transaction.

ABS Communications sold KEMX, KCXR, and KTFR to Key Plus Broadcasting effective August 19, 2015; the purchase price was $800,000.

References

External links

EMX